"Baby Make Love" is a song by the Italian disco duo La Bionda from their 1979 album Bandido. It was written by Carmelo La Bionda, Michelangelo La Bionda and Richard Palmer-James.

Track listing and formats 

 Italian 7-inch single

A. "Baby Make Love" – 4:14
B. "There's No Other Way" – 2:43

Credits and personnel 

 Carmelo La Bionda – songwriter, vocals
 Michelangelo La Bionda – songwriter, vocals
 Richard Palmer-James – songwriter
 Harry Thumann – engineering
 Chris Bellman – mastering
 Jürgen Koppers – mixing
 Charly Ricanek – arranger

Credits and personnel adapted from the Bandido album and 7-inch single liner notes.

Charts

Weekly charts

References

External links 

 

1978 songs
1978 singles
Baby Records singles
La Bionda songs
Songs written by Richard Palmer-James